General Sir Edward Pemberton Leach  (2 April 1847 – 27 April 1913) was an Irish recipient of the Victoria Cross, the highest and most prestigious award for gallantry in the face of the enemy that can be awarded to British and Commonwealth forces.

Early life
Leach was born in County Londonderry, Ireland on 2 April 1847. He was educated at Highgate School in England.

Military career
Leach was commissioned into the Royal Engineers in 1866.

He was 31 years old, and a captain in the Corps of Royal Engineers, British Army and with Bengal Sappers and Miners (British Indian Army) during the Second Anglo-Afghan War when the following deed took place on 17 March 1879 near Maidanah, Afghanistan for which he was awarded the VC.

Later life
After this incident promotion followed and he was made Commander of 24 Field Company during the Suakin Expedition in 1885. He was promoted to Major-General on 1 October 1897. From April 1900 he was General Officer Commanding Belfast in which capacity he founded the Ballykinlar training camp. He was appointed General Officer Commanding the 9th Division within Third Army Corps in Ireland on 1 April 1902, and served until 1905. Later that year, he was appointed General Officer Commanding-in-Chief for Scottish Command where he served from 1905 to 1909 before he retired in 1912.

Leach died in Cadenabbia, Lake Como, Italy on 27 April 1913. His younger daughter Elsie Leach became a distinguished ornithologist.

The medal
His Victoria Cross is displayed at the Royal Engineers Museum, Chatham, England.

Notes

References
Listed in order of publication year 
The Register of the Victoria Cross (1981, 1988 and 1997)

Ireland's VCs  (Dept of Economic Development 1995)
The Sapper VCs (Gerald Napier, 1998)
Monuments to Courage (David Harvey, 1999)
Irish Winners of the Victoria Cross (Richard Doherty & David Truesdale, 2000)

External links
Royal Engineers Museum Sappers VCs

|-
 

1847 births
1913 deaths
19th-century Irish people
Irish officers in the British Army
Military personnel from County Londonderry
People educated at Highgate School
British Army generals
Irish recipients of the Victoria Cross
Knights Commander of the Order of the Bath
Knights Commander of the Royal Victorian Order
Bengal Sappers and Miners personnel
Royal Engineers officers
Second Anglo-Afghan War recipients of the Victoria Cross
British Army personnel of the Mahdist War
British Army recipients of the Victoria Cross
British military personnel of the Lushai Expedition